Ole Morten Vågan (born 8 May 1979) is a Norwegian jazz musician and composer (upright bass), and the older brother of guitarist Petter Vågan. He is known from several recordings and is currently acting as artistic director for the Trondheim Jazz Orchestra. Vagan is also known from cooperating with some of the most influential musicians and composers internationally and has released eight albums as a leader, recently with the TJO (Happy Endlings, Odin records 2018), as well as six albums with his group Motif and one with the group The Deciders.

Career 

Vågan was born in Brønnøysund. He began his career as a jazz musician in the Nord-Norsk Ungdomstorband at the end of the 1990s and launched his own project "Ole Morten Vågan Projekt" on tour for Nordnorsk Jazzforum in 1999. This was also documented with a concert for radio on NRK P2, Jazzklubben, hosted by Erling Wicklund recorded at Nordland Musikkfestuke. He was a graduate of the Jazz program at Trondheim Musikkonservatorium (1998–2002).

In 1999 he formed the quintet Motif, together with Atle Nymo (tenor saxophone), Mathias Eick (trumpet), David Thor Jonsson (piano) and Håkon Mjåset Johansen (drums), where he composes the main part of the repertoire himself. In 2000 Vågan lead the band Motif at Moldejazz and was awarded "NOPA's Composer Prize" the same year, as well as "Young Nordic Jazzcomets" the year after, at Copenhagen Jazz Festival.

As both a bassist and composer, he has worked at the intersection of improvised and notated music, and in 2011 published his seventh disc with the aforementioned MOTIF, to critical acclaim. In 2009 he wrote an hour's music to a tentett, which besides Motif'''s permanent members, included Mathias Eick, Mattias Ståhl, Ola Kvernberg, Håkon Kornstad, and Petter Vågan. Vågan mottok DnB NOR prisen på Kongsberg Jazzfestival i 2009, and came back the following year with new music, this time for a band consisting of influential musicians from the European improvisational scenes: Axel Dörner and Rudi Mahall (DE), as well as Fredrik Ljungkvist and Jon Fält (SE).

 Honors 
2009: Kongsberg Jazz Award

 Discography 
With Motif
2004: Motif (AIM Records)
2005: Expansion (AIM Records)
2008: Apo Calypso (Jazzland Recordings)
2010: Facienda (Jazzland Records)
2011: Art Transplant (Clean Feed Records), with Axel Dörner
2016: My Head Is Listening (Clean Feed Records)

With Tore Johansen
2001: Happy Days (Gemini Records)
2002: Windows (Gemini Records)
2005: Like That (Gemini Records)
2007: Rainbow Session (Inner Ear)

With Klaus Ellerhusen Holm
2004: Two Way Street (Jazzaway Records)
2006: What Was That You Said? (Jazzaway Records), as Klaus Holm Kollektif

With Maria Kannegaard Trio
2005: Quiet Joy (Jazzland Records)
2007: Live in Oslo (MNJ Records), with Trondheim Jazz Orchestra2008: Camel walk (Jazzland Records)

With Trondheim Jazz Orchestra feat. Eirik Hegdal
2005: We Are? (Jazzaway Records)
2008: Wood And Water (MNJ Records)
2009: What if? (MNJ Records)

With Jonas Kullhammar
2005: Andratx (Moserobie Music Production)
2009: Andratx Live (Moserobie Music Production)

With 'Juxtaposed'
2010: Tsar Bomba (Bolage Records)

With Gammalgrass
2013: Obsolete Music 1 (Division Records)

With The Deciders
2013: We Travel The Airwaves (Jazzland Recordings)

With Obara International
2013: Komeda (For Tune)
2013: Live At Manggha (For Tune)
2015: Live In Mińsk Mazowiecki (For Tune)

With Thomas Strønen
2015: Time Is A Blind Guide (ECM Records)

With Snik
2015: Metasediment Rock (Clean Feed Records)

With Team Hegdal
2015: Vol 3 (Particular Recordings)
2017: Vol 4 (Particular Recordings)

With Maciej Obara Quartet
2017: Unloved (ECM Records)

With others
2004: Please don't shoot (Moserobie Music), with the band 'Brat' (Eirik Hegdal)
2005: First Communion (Jazzaway Records), with Anders Aarum Trio2005: Christmas Songs (Jazzavdelingen), with Nora Brockstedt
2005: Two Way Street (Jazzaway Records), with Roundtrip2007: The Arcades Project (Jazzland Recordings/Universal Music Norway), with Håvard Wiik Trio
2007: Subaquatic Disco (AIM Records), with The Espen Reinertsen Organic Jukebox
2008: 52 : 29 (Grappa Music), with Erlend Skomsvoll (CD/DWD)
2008: New Conceptions of Jazz Box (Jazzland Recordings), with Bugge Wesseltoft (3xCD)
2008: Maryland – Live! (Moserobie Music), with Maryland (9) (Maria Kannegaard)
2008: Lucid Grey (Dravle Records), with Tore Brunborg
2008: A Festa Vale Tudo ( Records), with Erik Nylanders Orkester2009: Assim Falava Jazzatustra (Clean Feed), with Júlio Resende
2011: Liarbird (2011), with Ola Kvernberg
2011: You Taste Like A Song'' (Clean Feed), with Júlio Resende Trio

References

External links 

}

1979 births
Living people
Musicians from Brønnøy
Jazz double-bassists
Norwegian jazz composers
Norwegian jazz upright-bassists
Male double-bassists
Norwegian University of Science and Technology alumni
21st-century double-bassists
21st-century Norwegian male musicians
Maria Kannegaard Trio members
Trondheim Jazz Orchestra members
Motif (band) members
Jazzland Recordings (1997) artists
Clean Feed Records artists